Ilsetraut Hadot (born 20 December 1928) in Berlin, is a philosopher and historian of philosophy who specialised in Stoicism, Neoplatonism and more generally in Ancient Philosophy.

Biography 
In 1978, Hadot won the Victor Cousin prize of the Académie française for her work The problem of Alexandrian Neoplatonism. Hierocles and Simplicius. In 2015, she received the François-Millepierres prize by the Académie for her work Seneca. Spiritual Direction and Practice of Philosophy.

In 1966, she graduated the Dr. Phil. at the Free University of Berlin about Seneca and Spiritual Direction in Antiquity. She defended her State thesis in 1977, a Doctor of Arts at Paris-Sorbonne University (Paris IV).

She met Pierre Hadot during a symposium in Cologne in 1962 and they married in Berlin in 1966. He is also a specialist of Ancient Philosophy. Together, they wrote Learn to Philosophize in Antiquity, in 2004.

Research works 
Ilsetraut Hadot is a classical philologist and a specialist about Ancient Philosophy. She has written about Seneca, the history of education in Antiquity and Neoplatonism. She has edited, commentated and translated the commentary of Simplicius, a Neoplatonist philosopher, about the Enchiridion of Epictetus.

Works 

 Seneca und die Griechisch-Römische Tradition der Seelenleitung, Berlin, Walter de Gruyter & Co., 1969, 232p.
 (With Pierre Hadot) Apprendre à philosopher dans l'Antiquité : L'enseignement du « Manuel d'Épictète » et son commentaire néoplatonicien, ("Learn to Philosophize in Antiquity: the Lesson from Enchiridion of Epictetus and its Neoplatonician Commentary") Paris, Le Livre de Poche, 2004, 216 p. .
 Arts libéraux et philosophie dans la pensée antique : Contribution à l'histoire de l'éducation et de la culture dans l'Antiquité ("Liberal Arts and Philosophy in Ancient thought: Contribution at the history of education and culture in Antiquity"), Paris, Vrin, 2006, 576 p. .
 Le Néoplatonicien Simplicius à la lumière des recherches contemporaines : Un bilan critique (The Neoplatonician Simplicius in light of contemporary researches: a critical appraisal) (with two contributions of Philippe Vallat), Saint Augustin, Academia Verlag, 2014, 309 p. .
 Le Problème du néoplatonisme alexandrin : Hiéroclès et Simplicius (The Problem of alexandrian neoplatonism : Hierocles and Simplicius), Paris, Études augustiniennes, 1978, 243 p. .
 Sénèque. Direction spirituelle et pratique de la philosophie (Seneca. Spiritual Direction and practice of philosophy), Paris, Vrin, 2014, 456 p. 
 Studies on the Neoplatonist Hierocles, Philadelphia, American philosophical society, 2004, 152 p. 
 Athenian and Alexandrian Neoplatonism and the Harmonization of Aristotle and Plato, Leiden, Boston, Brill, 2015, 188 p.

Translations, prefaces 
 Seneca, Consolations, Paris, Payot & Rivages, 1992, 140 p. , translated by Colette Lazam, preface by Ilsetraut Hadot.
 Simplicius, Commentaire sur les Catégories ("Commentary about the Categories"), Leyde, Brill, 1989, Philosophia Antiqua, 240 p. , translated under the direction of Ilsetraut Hadot.
 Simplicius, Commentaire sur le Manuel d'Épictète. Introduction & édition critique du texte grec par Ilsetraut Hadot ("Commentary about the Enchiridion of Epictetus. Introduction & critical edition of the Greek text by Ilsetraut Hadot"), Leyden, New-York, Cologne, Brill, 1996, 479p.
 Simplicius, Commentaire sur le Manuel d'Épictète. Chapitres I-XXIX ("Commentary about the Enchiridion of Epictetus. Chapters I-XXIX"), Paris, Les Belles Lettres, 2001, 314 p.

Notes and References 

French hellenists
Scholars of ancient philosophy
21st-century French historians
20th-century French historians
21st-century French philosophers
20th-century French philosophers
1928 births
Living people